Bela W. Jenks may refer to:
 Bela W. Jenks (born 1824) (1824–1897), Michigan politician
 Bela W. Jenks (born 1849) (1849–1930), Michigan politician